Dan Tetsell (born 2 July 1974) is a British actor, comedian and writer for radio, television and stage. He has worked on a number of projects, including The Museum of Everything, That Was Then, This Is Now, Newsjack and Parsons and Naylor's Pull-Out Sections. Notably, he created CBBC series Young Dracula with Museum of Everything colleague Danny Robins. He is married to comedy actor Margaret Cabourn-Smith.

At the 2005 Edinburgh Festival Fringe, he performed a one-man comedy show entitled Sins of the Grandfathers, focusing on his grandfather's Nazi past.

Notable TV roles include Brian in the BBC Two situation comedy Lab Rats and the voice of the cat Marion in the BBC Three adult puppet comedy Mongrels. He has appeared in episodes of the BBC TV comedies Miranda and Psychoville.

He starred alongside Richard Herring, Emma Kennedy, and Christian Reilly on Richard Herring's weekly podcast, As It Occurs To Me.

In 2012 he joined British soap Hollyoaks, playing new regular "cunning" solicitor Jim McGinn; he made his first appearance on 30 November. His character was killed by Fraser Black (Jesse Birdsall) in January 2014.

Filmography

References

External links
Official website

English comedy writers
Living people
English male comedians
English people of German descent
English male television actors
English male voice actors
Male actors from London
1974 births